"All You Pretty Girls" is a song written by Andy Partridge of the English rock band XTC, released on their 1984 album The Big Express. It peaked at number 55 on the UK Singles Chart, and its music video cost £33,000 to make. Partridge remembers that song came about while he was "dicking around, playing some Hendrix. ... I was just playing this little two-note, quasi-Hendrix thing, and I liked the inherent melody in it."

With the exception of the opening, all the drum sounds in the recording were made with a LinnDrum.  The reed organ sound comes from a Prophet-5, while the choir sounds were a Mellotron sample played out of a speaker inside a fire bucket.

Personnel
XTC
Dave Gregory – keyboards
Colin Moulding
Andy Partridge
Additional personnel
Pete Phipps – drums

Charts

References

External links
"All You Pretty Girls" on Chalkhills

XTC songs
1984 singles
1984 songs
Virgin Records singles
Songs written by Andy Partridge
Sea shanties